Crawford County is a county located in the Ozarks region of the U.S. state of Arkansas. As of the 2020 census, the population was 60,133. The county seat and largest city is Van Buren. Crawford County was formed on October 18, 1820, from the former Lovely County and Indian Territory, and was named for William H. Crawford, the United States Secretary of War in 1815.

Located largely within the Ozarks, the southern border of the county is the Arkansas River, placing the extreme southern edge of the county in the Arkansas River Valley. The frontier county became an early crossroads, beginning with a California Gold Rush and developing into the Butterfield Overland Mail, Civil War trails and railroads such as the St. Louis and San Francisco Railway, the Little Rock and Fort Smith Railroad, and the St. Louis, Iron Mountain and Southern Railway. Today the county is home to the intersection of two major interstate highways, Interstate 40 (I-40) and I-49. Crawford County is part of the Fort Smith metropolitan area. As a dry county, alcohol sales are generally prohibited, though recent changes to county law provide for exemptions.

Geography
Crawford County is located in the northwest region of Arkansas.

Major highways

 Interstate 40
 Interstate 49
 
 
 Highway 59
 Highway 60
 Highway 162
 Highway 282
 Highway 348

Crawford County is included in an area designated for a planned extension of I-49 into Arkansas. The final project will connect New Orleans, Louisiana, to Kansas City, Missouri, a large trucking corridor which is currently not served by an Interstate highway.  The proposed highway would utilize portions of I-49 which currently runs north from Van Buren toward the Missouri state line passing through Benton County, home of Walmart. The corridor was listed as the number-one high-priority corridor by transportation officials in the Intermodal Surface Transportation Efficiency Act.

Adjacent counties
 Washington County (north)
 Madison County (northeast)
 Franklin County (east)
 Sebastian County (south)
 Le Flore County, Oklahoma (southwest)
 Sequoyah County, Oklahoma (west)
 Adair County, Oklahoma (northwest)

National protected area
 Ozark National Forest (part)

Demographics

2020 census

As of the 2020 United States census, there were 60,133 people, 23,958 households, and 17,082 families residing in the county.

2000 census
As of the 2000 census, there were 53,247 people, 19,702 households, and 15,150 families residing in the county.  The population density was 35/km2 (89/mi2).  There were 21,315 housing units at an average density of 14/km2 (36/mi2).  The racial makeup of the county was 92.19% White, 0.87% Black or African American, 2.01% Native American, 1.19% Asian, 0.02% Pacific Islander, 1.48% from other races, and 2.24% from two or more races.  3.27% of the population were Hispanic or Latino of any race.

There were 19,702 households, out of which 37.50% had children under the age of 18 living with them, 62.20% were married couples living together, 10.90% had a female householder with no husband present, and 23.10% were non-families. 20.00% of all households were made up of individuals, and 8.20% had someone living alone who was 65 years of age or older.  The average household size was 2.68 and the average family size was 3.07.

In the county, the population was spread out, with 28.20% under the age of 18, 8.40% from 18 to 24, 29.30% from 25 to 44, 22.80% from 45 to 64, and 11.30% who were 65 years of age or older.  The median age was 35 years. For every 100 females, there were 97.70 males.  For every 100 females age 18 and over, there were 94.20 males.

The median income for a household in the county was $32,871, and the median income for a family was $36,741. Males had a median income of $29,581 versus $20,352 for females. The per capita income for the county was $15,015.  About 10.90% of families and 14.20% of the population were below the poverty line, including 19.30% of those under age 18 and 13.70% of those age 65 or over.

Controversy
Thousands of self-claimed "Western Band of Cherokee" (or Arkansas Cherokees) fought for state and federal recognition as a political entity of Native Americans. Crawford County (specifically, that area known as "Lovely's Purchase") was historically part of the Cherokee Nation, which lost its tribal sovereignty status as a result of the U.S. Civil War in the 1860s. The Cherokee Nation was subsequently relocated to the west in the present-day state of Oklahoma. 

The violent arrest of Randal Worcester by two Crawford County sheriff's deputies and one Mulberry police officer took place in Mulberry, Crawford County, in August 2022.

Government
Crawford County is a longtime Republican stronghold, so much so that not even former governor and native Arkansan Bill Clinton was able to carry it in either of his presidential victories. The last Democrat (as of 2020) to carry this county was Jimmy Carter in 1976.

Communities

Cities
 Alma
 Cedarville
 Dyer
 Kibler
 Mountainburg
 Mulberry
 Van Buren (county seat)

Towns
 Chester
 Rudy

Unincorporated community
 Dora
 Natural Dam, Arkansas

Townships

 Alma (most of Alma)
 Bidville
 Cedar Creek
 Cedarville (Cedarville)
 Chester (Chester, small part of Mountainburg)
 Cove City
 Dean Springs (small part of Alma)
 Dora (part of Van Buren)
 Dyer (Dyer, small part of Alma)
 Jasper
 Kibler (most of Kibler)
 Lancaster
 Lees Creek
 Locke
 Mountainburg (most of Mountainburg)
 Mulberry (most of Mulberry)
 Oliver Springs
 Porter
 Rudy (Rudy, very small part of Alma)
 Uniontown
 Upper
 Van Buren (most of Van Buren, part of Kibler)
 Vine Prairie (part of Mulberry)
 Whitley
 Winfrey

See also
 List of lakes in Crawford County, Arkansas
 National Register of Historic Places listings in Crawford County, Arkansas

References

External links

 Crawford County government's website
 Crawford County Sheriff's Office

 
1820 establishments in Arkansas Territory
Populated places established in 1820
Fort Smith metropolitan area